This is a list of civil parishes in the ceremonial county of Warwickshire, England. There are 219 civil parishes.

See also
 List of civil parishes in England

References

External links
 Office for National Statistics : Geographical Area Listings
 Warwickshire County Council : Parish and Town Councils Database

Civil parishes
Warwickshire